This is a list of deaths that took place in 2015 related to British television.

January

February

March

April

May

June

July

August

September

October

November

December

See also
 2015 in British music
 2015 in British radio
 2015 in the United Kingdom
 List of British films of 2015

References